Events from the year 1903 in Sweden

Incumbents
 Monarch – Oscar II 
 Prime Minister – Erik Gustaf Boström

Events
 The National Association for Women's Suffrage is founded.
 Agnes Arvidsson becomes the first woman to graduate in pharmacology.
 Public medical offices open to women.
 Forming of the Central Employers' Association (SAF)
 The SAF game rather late in the labor union movement of Sweden
 Counterpart of the labor union, LO
 Acted as open cartel

Popular culture

Literature
 August Strindberg's novel Alone is published.

Births
 31 January – Ivar Johansson, wrestler (died 1979).
 21 June – Alf Sjöberg, theatre and film director (died 1980)

Exact date missing 
 Israel Ruong, Swedish-Sámi linguist and politician (died 1986).

Deaths

 19 May – Carl Snoilsky, poet (born 1841)
 27 July –  Lina Sandell, hymn writer (born 1832).
 14 September – Johanna Berglind, sign language teacher and principal (born 1816).
 March – Josefina Wettergrund, writer (born 1830)

References

 
Sweden
Years of the 20th century in Sweden